1985 Emmy Awards may refer to:

 37th Primetime Emmy Awards, the 1985 Emmy Awards ceremony honoring primetime programming
 12th Daytime Emmy Awards, the 1985 Emmy Awards ceremony honoring daytime programming
 13th International Emmy Awards, the 1985 Emmy Awards ceremony honoring international programming

Emmy Award ceremonies by year